The Nokia N77 is a 3G smartphone from Nokia, introduced on 12 February 2007 and released in June 2007. It runs on Symbian 9.1 (S60 3rd Edition). The N77's specs were somewhat basic compared with most Nseries devices at the time, but it included a DVB-H television tuner. As stated in Nokia's press release, the N77 was designed as a low-cost mobile TV to accelerate DVB-H adoption. Sporting a candybar design similar to the N73, it was the company's second DVB-H device after the N92, though it did have a smaller screen. The N77 was thus only available in limited DVB-H markets and are now hard to come by.

See also 
Nokia 7710
Nokia N92
Nokia N96
Nokia 5330 Mobile TV Edition
Nokia N8
 List of Nokia products

References

Nokia Nseries